Opsiini is a tribe of leafhoppers in the subfamily Deltocephalinae. The tribe contains 36 genera and over 300 species divided into four subtribes: Achaeticina, Circuliferina, Eremophlepsiina, and Opsiina.

Genera
There are currently 36 described genera divided into four subtribes within Opsiini:

Subtribe Achaeticina 

Subtribe Circuliferina 

Subtribe Eremophlepsiina 

Subtribe Opsiina

References 

 Opsiini on www1.dpi.nsw.gov.au
 Opsiini on www.biolib.cz

 
Deltocephalinae
Hemiptera tribes